Ahnlund is a surname. Notable people with the surname include:

Knut Ahnlund (1923–2012), Swedish literary historian and writer
Nils Ahnlund (1889–1957), Swedish historian

Swedish-language surnames